Pheasant Creek may refer to

Streams 
 Pheasant Creek, a creek in Saskatchewan, Canada
 Pheasant Creek (Santa Clara County), a tributary of Guadalupe Creek in California, United States
 Pheasant Creek (Fisher River tributary), a tributary of the Fisher River in North Carolina, United States

Municipalities 
 Pheasant Creek, Queensland, a rural locality in the Shire of Banana, Queensland, Australia
 Pheasant Creek, Victoria, a locality in Victoria, Australia